Jascha Richter (born 24 June 1963) is a Danish-American singer-songwriter best known as the lead vocalist and keyboardist of the soft rock band Michael Learns to Rock, where he composes and sings most of their songs. Some of his best known songs include "25 Minutes", "The Actor", "Sleeping Child", "That's Why (You Go Away)", "Take Me to Your Heart", "Complicated Heart", "Someday", "Wild Women", "Out of the Blue", "You Took My Heart Away" and "Paint My Love".

Early life 
Richter was born on 24 June 1963 in New Hampshire, United States, before his family decided to move back to Denmark, where they settled in Århus. He holds both Danish and American citizenship. As a child, Richter started playing the flute and cello and then the piano. He was raised with classical music; however, in his early teenage years he started to play and compose pop music. Growing up, he listened to Elton John, Supertramp and Bee Gees among others.

Career
Richter is known as the brain behind the Danish soft rock band Michael Learns to Rock, who have enjoyed success since the early 1990s, particularly in Asia. They scored number one chart hits in Norway and Denmark with "The Actor" and "That's Why (You Go Away)", respectively.

Richter has also released two solo albums; Planet Blue in 2002 and Where I Belong in 2006. An extended play titled Dannevang was released in 2021.

Discography

Solo albums 
 Planet Blue (2002)
 Where I Belong (2006)

Extended plays 
 Dannevang (2021)

Compilation albums 
 Grænseløs Greatest (1999)

References

External links 
Jascha Richter on Instagram

1963 births
Living people
21st-century Danish male singers
Danish pop musicians
Danish rock musicians
English-language singers from Denmark
Danish male singer-songwriters
Soft rock musicians
Ballad musicians